Camille Rankine is an American poet. She was born and raised in Portland, Oregon, earned a BA at Harvard University and an MFA at Columbia University.

Rankine is the author of the chapbook, Slow Dance with Trip Wire, selected by Cornelius Eady for the Poetry Society of America's 2010 New York Chapbook Fellowship. 
Her debut full-length collection, Incorrect Merciful Impulses, was released by Copper Canyon Press in 2016.

She was formerly assistant director of the MFA Program in Creative Writing at Manhattanville College and lives in New York City.

Rankine has won literary prizes including the "Discovery"/Boston Review Poetry Prize, a MacDowell Colony fellowship, and an honorary Cave Canem Foundation fellowship.

Bibliography

 Incorrect Merciful Impulses, Copper Canyon Press, 2016
 Slow Dance with Trip Wire, 2011 (chapbook)
The Free World, Poetry Society of America

References

Year of birth missing (living people)
Living people
21st-century American poets
Manhattanville College faculty
Harvard University alumni
Writers from Portland, Oregon
Columbia University School of the Arts alumni
Poets from Oregon
American women poets
21st-century American women writers
American women academics